Tha Nuea is a tambon (subdistrict) of Mae On District, in Chiang Mai Province, Thailand. In 2018 it had a total population of 2,445 people.

Administration

Central administration
The tambon is subdivided into 5 administrative villages (muban).

Local administration
The whole area of the subdistrict is covered by the subdistrict administrative organization (SAO) Tha Nuea (องค์การบริหารส่วนตำบลทาเหนือ).

References

External links
Thaitambon.com on Tha Nuea

Tambon of Chiang Mai province
Populated places in Chiang Mai province